Samit Kakkad is an Indian filmmaker and director. He is best known for directing Aayna Ka Bayna (2012) which was selected for 18 International film festivals and Half Ticket (2017) which won the Ecumenical Jury Award at the 57th Zlin International Film Festival 2017.

Career
Samit was born in Mumbai to Ad/Corporate filmmaker Amar Kakkad. Keen on becoming a filmmaker too, he learnt his craft by reading cinema-specific books and assisting his father on documentaries and ad films. He started his career as an editor on TV shows and segued to assisting directors like Mahesh Manjrekar and Rahul Dholakia. Kakkad has stated that there is no better film school than a set and the post-production set up where one can learn how a story comes to life.

Using his experience as a line-producer, Kakkad stepped headlong into the entertainment arena as a  producer and creative director with Huppa Huiyaa (2010). He turned director with his next production, the dance-based Aayna Ka Bayna (2012) which was selected to represent India at 18 International film festivals and chosen as the closing film of Toronto’s  Reel World Film Festival. The movie is the first Marathi film to be dubbed in Hindi for Sony Max.

Samit Kakkad's second film as a director was Half Ticket, an adaptation of the national award winning Tamil film Kaaka Muttai. Half Ticket was telecast at 20 International Film Festivals and won the prestigious Ecumenical Jury Award at the 57th Zlin International Film Festival 2017 and was warmly received by critics.   Hollywood Reporter called it a "predictable but satisfying Indian comedic drama."

Kakkad followed it with  Ascharya Chak It (2017), his first directorial venture in Hindi, before making his debut in the OTT arena with the well-received web series Indori Ishq (2021). The commonality between all his films is the underbelly of Mumbai which the director has explored at length.

Projects On The Floors

Kakkad’s upcoming projects include the Marathi film 36 Gunn which features Santosh Juvekar, Purva Pawar and Pushkar Shrotri in its cast. He is also helming Topaz, a biopic on bar dancer Sweety, which is produced by  Sanjay Gupta. Kakkad’s Hindi Web show Dharavi Bank starring Suniel Shetty and Vivek Oberoi is in postproduction.

Milestones

Kakkad’s directorial debut Aayna Ka Bayna was screened extensively in the international festival circuit.

His second directorial venture Half Ticket won the Ecumenical Jury Award at the 57th Zlin International Film Festival 2017.

Filmography

References

External links 

1974 births
Living people
Indian filmmakers
Film producers from Mumbai
Film directors from Mumbai
Hindi film producers
21st-century Indian film directors